Michael von der Nonne was a Russian architect of ethnic German ancestry. He is best known for being state architect-engineer of Erivan Governorate and member of the City Duma.

Background 
Michael von der Nonne was born on May 12, 1838 in the St. Petersburg Governorate. His father Johann Georg August Ernst von der Nonne (1798-1860) was a German nobleman originally from the city of Bodenwerder, Lower Saxony. His mother Anna (1810-1891) belonged to baronial family of von Tornau.

Career 
On June 4, 1854, he entered military service as deputy chief of staff. In 1868 he moved to Yerevan. 1876-1909 was the chief architect of Yerevan. He is the author of a number of public and private construction projects, including the architect of the building of the Yerevan prison (built 1800, the prison has not survived), the Male gymnasium on Astafyevskaya (currently Abovyan street, built 1881), Iranian Consulate building (now on Republic Street), Male Gymnasium on Nazarovskaya (now - Amiryan Street), Profitable houses of Murtuzgulu Khan (built 1900), the Shustov Cognac Alcohol Production Plant (now Yerevan Ararat Brandy Factory, built 1907). 

He was promoted to be colonel on 20 June 1884. In 1895 he was awarded the Order of St. Vladimir and in 1897 - Order of St. Stanislav. Later in 1898 he was elected to Yerevan City Duma, at the sametimehe was the Chairman of the Provincial Guardianship of Prisons Committee. 

He died on 12 April 1919 from senile marasmus and buried in Lutheran cemetery of Baku, Azerbaijan.

Family 
He was married to Sofia Nikolayevna and had 7 issues with her.

 Nikolai Mikhailovich (b. 1901, Moscow) worked in the Main Directorate of Land Management and Agriculture in the Caucasus, Tbilisi (1912-1916)
 Sergei Mikhailovich - deputy clerk, collegiate secretary in the Yerevan Governorate Treasury (1912-1917).
 Boris Mikhailovich - married Lydia Pavlovna, had two issues including Mikhail (b. 1894) 
 Mikhail Mikhailovich - married Anna Sergeyevna, had two issues, including Alexander von der Nonne (1923-2009)

He also had several brothers and sister, namely Alexander (b. 1831), Theodore (b. 1836), Nikolaus (1836-1908) and Anna (married Eugen Alexander von Ovander in 1864). His elder brother Nikolaus von der Nonne was also an engineer and architect, as well as Mayor of Baku.

References 

1838 births
1919 deaths
Lutherans from the Russian Empire
Burials in Baku
Architects from Saint Petersburg
Architects from Yerevan